Maria Alida Catharina "Marjan" Janus (born 31 January 1952) is a former breaststroke swimmer from the Netherlands. In 1968, she won the 100 m breaststroke event at the national championships, beating the long-time favorite Klenie Bimolt. She was therefore selected for the 1968 Summer Olympics, but failed to reach the final.

References

1952 births
Living people
Dutch female breaststroke swimmers
Olympic swimmers of the Netherlands
Swimmers at the 1968 Summer Olympics
People from Heemstede
Sportspeople from North Holland